Arthur Weglein is an American seismologist. He is the Hugh Roy & Lillie Cranz Cullen distinguished professor of physics at the University of Houston, and director of its Mission-oriented Seismic Research Program. He received the Townsend Harris Medal of the City College of New York in 2008 for his contributions to seismology. He received the Reginald Fessenden Award of the Society of Exploration Geophysicists in 2010.
He received the Maurice Ewing Medal of the Society of Exploration Geophysicists in 2016.

Education
Weglein received his BS in mathematics (1964) and MA in physics (1969) from the City College of New York. His PhD in physics from the Graduate Center of the City of New York was awarded in 1975. His thesis was entitled "Optimized Average Excited States of Atoms: Intermediate Energy Scattering", and his adviser was Marvin H. Mittleman.

http://mosrp.uh.edu/news/m-osrp-update-for-your-possible-interest-resending-a-2013-note-to-the-m-osrp-advisory-board

http://www.uh.edu/people/faculty/arthur-weglein

Books

References

Year of birth missing (living people)
Living people
21st-century American physicists
University of Houston faculty
City College of New York alumni